Yuppies 2 is a 1986 Italian comedy film directed by Enrico Oldoini.

The film is a sequel to Carlo Vanzina's comedy Yuppies, released earlier in the same year. It was the second most popular Italian film in Italy during 1987, behind The Name of the Rose with 2.8 million admissions.

Cast

References

External links

1986 films
Films directed by Enrico Oldoini
1980s Italian-language films
1986 comedy films
Italian comedy films
1980s Italian films